The following lists events that happened during 2012 in the Kingdom of Saudi Arabia.

Incumbents
Monarch: Abdullah
Crown Prince: Nayef (until 16 June), Salman (since 16 June)

Events

March
 March 7 - Sweden is reported to be helping Saudi Arabia construct plans for a weapons factory.

References

 
2010s in Saudi Arabia
Saudi Arabia
Saudi Arabia
Years of the 21st century in Saudi Arabia